Dirk Hillbrecht (born Hannover, 10 June 1972) is a software developer and a former leader of the Pirate Party Germany.

He is also a campaigner against software patents, and regional contact for patentfrei.de in Niedersachsen.

References

External links 
 Dirk Hillbrecht personal homepage

1972 births
Living people
Pirate Party Germany politicians
Leaders of political parties in Germany
Politicians from Hanover